MBNL may refer to:

Proteins
 MBNL1
 MBNL2
 MBNL3

Telecommunications
 Mobile Broadband Network Limited